Princeton Summer Theater  was founded in 1968 by a group of Princeton University undergraduates under the name 'Summer Intime' as a high grade summer stock theater company.

Organizational history
In the 1930s, members of student-run Theater Intime, initiated summer theater at Princeton. From the late 1920s until the 50s students called the summer company the University Players. The University Players operated from Hamilton Murray Theater for years. In 1968, the group became semi-independent from the University under the name "Summer Intime",and in the late 70s it was renamed Princeton Summer Theater. Every summer a new company of Princeton students forms to present a season of four main stage shows and a children's show.

Dedicated to training future leaders of the theater world, Princeton Summer Theater offers students and young professionals experience working in every area of theatre production, from performance, to design, to marketing, to theater management. In recent years the company has also included members from the Tisch School of the Arts at NYU, Rutgers University and Rider University. Notable alumni include John Lithgow, Bebe Neuwirth, William Hootkins, Geoff Rich, Mark Nelson, Winnie Holzman, Bretaigne Windust and Henry Fonda.

Hamilton Murray Theater was dubbed a "jewel box of a theater" by Stuart Duncan of the "Princeton Packet".

Princeton Summer Theater celebrated its half-centennial along with Theatre Intime's centennial in November 2022, after delays due to the COVID-19 pandemic.

Current season
After a hiatus in 2021 due to the COVID-19 pandemic, the 2022 season opened as PST's 52nd season. The season featured three shows.
2022
The Great Gatsby by F. Scott Fitzgerald, adapted by Simon Levy 
The Fox on the Fairway by Ken Ludwig 
Detroit '67 by Dominique Morisseau

Past seasons

University Players 
1928
The Dover Road by A. A. Milne
Beyond the Horizon by Eugene O'Neill
The Torch-Bearers by George Kelly
The Jest by Sam Benelli
In the Next Room by Eleanor Belmont and Harriet Ford
The New Way by Annie Nathan Meyer
Is Zat So
The Thirteenth Chair by Bayard Veiller

1929
The Devil in the Cheese by Tom Cushing
The Donovan Affair by Owen Davis (directed by Henry Fonda)
Outward Bound by Sutton Vane
The Last Warning by Thomas F. Fallon (directed by Bretaigne Windust '28)
Merton of the Movies by George S. Kaufman and Marc Connelly
Crime by Kent Smith
The Bad Man by Porter Emerson Browne
The Czarina by Melchior Lengyel and Ludwig Biro
The Constant Nymph by Margaret Kennedy and Basil Dean (directed by Charles Leatherbee)

1930
Murray Hill by Leslie Howard
The Wooden Kimono by Bretaigne Windust
The Watched Pot by Saki and Charles Maude
Thunder on the Left by Jean Ferguson Black
The Makropulos Affair by Karel Čapek  
The Firebrand by Edwin Justus Mayer
Hell-Bent Fer Heaven by Hatcher Hughes
The Marquise by Noël Coward 
A Kiss for Cinderella by J.M. Barrie

1931
Paris Found by Philip Barry 
Interference by Roland Pertwee and Harold Dearden
Mr. Pim Passes By by A. A. Milne
Coquette by Ann Preston Bridgers and George Abbott
Her Cardboard Lover by Jacques Deval (Dans sa candeur naïve, translated by Valerie Wyngate and P. G. Wodehouse) 
The Trial of Mary Dugan by Bayard Veiller 
The Guardsman by Ferenc Molnár (original title: Testőr)
Juno and the Paycock by Seán O'Casey 
The Silent House by John G. Brandon and George Pickett 
The Italian Straw Hat (Un chapeau de paille d'Italie) by Eugène Marin Labiche and Marc Michel

In July 1933 a fire devastated the theater, starting in the basement and burning up the entire stage. It was renovated over the summer.

1948
No Exit (Huis clos) by Jean-Paul Sartre
How He Lied to Her Husband by George Bernard Shaw
The Beautiful People by William Saroyan
Yes Is for a Very Young Man by Gertrude Stein

1949
The Vegetable by F. Scott Fitzgerald
Cathleen ni Houlihan by W. B. Yeats
Purgatory by W. B. Yeats 
The End of the Beginning by Seán O'Casey
The Streets of New York by Dion Boucicault

In 1951 and 1952, no productions were staged due to the Korean War.

1953
The Rose Tattoo by Tennessee Williams 
The Devil's Disciple by George Bernard Shaw 
The Infernal Machine by Jean Cocteau 
Hello Out There by William Saroyan
The Apollo of Bellac by Jean Giraudoux 
Red Peppers by Noël Coward 
The Italian Straw Hat (Un chapeau de paille d'Italie) by Eugène Marin Labiche and Marc Michel 
The Tempest by William Shakespeare

1954
Camino Real by Tennessee Williams 
Right You Are (If you think so) (Così è (se vi pare)) by Luigi PirandelloA Penny for a Song by John Whiting (American première)Theatre of the Soul by Nikolai EvreinovQueens of France by Thornton Wilder Village Wooing by George Bernard ShawGhosts (original Danish title: Gengangere) by Henrik Ibsen Show Loves Me Not by Howard Lindsay Alice in Wonderland by Lewis Carroll adapted by Mario Siletti Twelfth Night by William Shakespeare

1956Saint Joan by George Bernard ShawCharley's Aunt by Brandon ThomasBlood Wedding by García LorcaThe Grass Harp by Truman Capote The Father (Swedish: Fadren) by August StrindbergRing Round the Moon by Christopher Fry (adapted from L'Invitation au Château by Jean Anouilh) The Happy Journey to Trenton and Camden by Thornton Wilder Bedtime Story by Seán O'CaseyAs You Like It by William Shakespeare

1957A Streetcar Named Desire by Tennessee Williams The Skin of Our Teeth by Thornton WilderHeartbreak House by George Bernard Shaw The Enchanted by Jean GiraudouxThe Love of Don Perlimplín and Belisa in the Garden  (original title: Amor de Don Perlimplín con Belisa en su jardín) by García Lorca The Tinker's Wedding by J. M. Synge The Shadow of a Gunman by Seán O'Casey Love's Labour's Lost by William ShakespeareLord Byron's Love Letter by Tennessee Williams

1958A View from the Bridge by Arthur MillerThe Matchmaker by Thornton WilderLegends of Lovers by Jean Anouilh (original title Eurydice, translated by Kitty Black as Point of Departure and republished as Legend of Lovers) The Burnt Flower Bed (L'aiuola bruciata) by Ugo Betti
An Evening of Tennessee Williams: Auto Da Fé, The Case of the Crushed Petunias, The Unsatisfactory Supper Misalliance by George Bernard Shaw Purple Dust by Seán O'Casey The Two Gentlemen of Verona by William Shakespeare

 Summer Intime 
1968The Night of the Iguana by Tennessee WilliamsAmphitryon 38 by Jean GiraudouxThe Trial (Le Procès) by André Gide and Jean-Louis Barrault (after the book by Franz Kafka)Arms and the Man by George Bernard Shaw

1969The Little Foxes by Lillian HellmanL'Idiote (or A Shot in the Dark) by Marcel AchardAnne of the Thousand Days by Maxwell AndersonHeartbreak House by George Bernard Shaw

1970The Eccentricities of a Nightingale by Tennessee WilliamsThe Playboy of the Western World by J. M. SyngeThe Homecoming by Harold PinterMisalliance by George Bernard Shaw

1971The Rainmaker by N. Richard NashTwelfth Night by William ShakespeareA Day in the Death of Joe Egg by Peter NicholsUncle Vanya by Anton Chekhov

1972Billy Liar by Keith Waterhouse and Willis HallHappy Birthday, Wanda June by Kurt VonnegutA Flea in Her Ear (La Puce à l'oreille) by Georges FeydeauWhat the Butler Saw by Joe Orton

1973The Philanthropist by Christopher HamptonThe Birthday Party by Harold PinterThe Beaux' Stratagem by George FarquharTango by Sławomir MrożekGeorge Washington Crossing the Delaware by Koch

1974Arms and the Man by George Bernard ShawLuv by Murray SchisgalBaby Want a Kiss by James CostiganThe Lion in Winter by James Goldman

1975Oh Dad, Poor Dad, Mamma's Hung You in the Closet and I'm Feelin' So Sad by Arthur KopitCharley's Aunt by Brandon ThomasThe Voice of the Turtle by John Van DrutenU.T.B.U. (Unhealthy To Be Unpleasant) by James Kirkwood, Jr.

1976Fallen Angels by Noël CowardThe Imaginary Invalid (Le malade imaginaire) by MolièreTwo for the Seesaw by William GibsonPicnic by William Inge

1977Cox and Box by F. C. Burnand and Arthur SullivanCandida by George Bernard ShawThe Creation of the World and Other Business by Arthur Miller110 in the Shade by Tom Jones and Harvey SchmidtAlice Through the Looking-Glass by Lewis Carroll, Florida Friebus and Eva Le Gallienne

1978Tartuffe by MolièreHoliday by Philip BarryMatch Play by McCleeryThe Mousetrap by Agatha Christie

1979Last of the Red Hot Lovers by Neil SimonTowards Zero by Agatha ChristieThe Matchmaker by Thornton WilderAfter the Fall by Arthur Miller

 Princeton Summer Theater 
1980The Devil's Disciple by George Bernard ShawThe Sorcerer by Gilbert and SullivanThe Mound Builders by Lanford WilsonNight Watch by Lucille Fletcher

In 1981 the theater was dark.

In 1982 and 1983 the summer company was known as Newstage at Intime

1982Scapino! by Jim Dale and Frank Dunlop (an adaptation of Molière's Les Fourberies de Scapin)The Belle of Amherst by William LuceHappy End by Kurt Weill, Elisabeth Hauptmann, and Bertolt BrechtThe Freedom of the City by Brian Friel

1983Bus Stop by William IngeTalking With... by Jane MartinMarch of the Falsettos by William FinnBetrayal by Harold Pinter

1984Sly Fox by Larry GelbartAngels Fall by Lanford WilsonSay Goodnight, Gracie by Rupert HolmesSide By Side By Sondheim by Stephen Sondheim

1985Beyond Therapy by Christopher DurangThe Skin of Our Teeth by Thornton WilderA Coupla White Chicks Sitting Around Talking by John Ford NoonanStarting Here, Starting Now by Richard Maltby, Jr. and David Shire

In 1986, a company from outside PST occupied The Hamilton Murray Theater.

1987Noises Off by Michael FraynDon Juan in Hell by George Bernard ShawArms and the Man by George Bernard ShawA Midsummer Night's Dream by William Shakespeare

The theater was dark in 1988 and 1989.

1990The Nerd by Larry ShueThree Postcards by Craig LucasTwelfth Night by William Shakespeare

1991The Mousetrap by Agatha ChristieSame Time, Next Year by Bernard SladeMuch Ado about Nothing by William ShakespeareDrinking in America by Eric Bogosian

1992Dial M for Murder by Frederick KnottBarefoot in the Park by Neil SimonRun for Your Wife by Ray Cooney

1993Sleuth by Anthony ShafferLittle Shop of Horrors by Alan Menken and Howard AshmanThe Good Doctor by Neil Simon

1994Speed-the-Plow by David MametPrivate Lives by Noël CowardA Midsummer Night's Dream by William ShakespeareIt's Only a Play1995The Glass Menagerie by Tennessee WilliamsThe Real Inspector Hound by Tom StoppardMuch Ado about Nothing by William ShakespeareWait Until Dark by Frederick Knott

1996The Fantastiks by Harvey Schmidt and Tom JonesThe Crucible by Arthur MillerRomeo and Juliet by William ShakespeareLend Me a Tenor by Ken Ludwig

1997Arsenic and Old Lace by Joseph KesselringCamelot by Alan Jay Lerner and Frederick LoeweThe Merchant of Venice by William ShakespeareOur Town by Thornton Wilder

1998Harvey by Mary ChaseShe Loves Me by Joe Masteroff, Sheldon Harnick and Jerry BockThe Taming of the Shrew by William ShakespeareThe Seagull by Anton Chekhov

During 1999 and 2000 extensive renovations carried out to the theater leaving it "dark".

2001Barefoot in the Park by Neil SimonMuch Ado about Nothing by William ShakespeareJoseph and the Amazing Technicolor Dreamcoat by Tim Rice and Andrew Lloyd WebberThe Effect of Gamma Rays on Man-in-the-Moon Marigolds by Paul Zindel

2002Direct from MoscowBaby with the Bathwater by Christopher DurangA Midsummer Night’s Dream by William ShakespeareThe Fantasticks by Harvey Schmidt and Tom JonesHow I Learned to Drive by Paula Vogel

2003 The Importance of Being Earnest by Oscar WildeYou're a Good Man, Charlie Brown by Clark GesnerRosencrantz and Guildenstern Are Dead by Tom StoppardThe Star-Spangled Girl by Neil Simon

2004The Complete Works of William Shakespeare (Abridged) by Adam Long, Daniel Singer and Jess WinfieldScenes From American LifePrivate Lives by Noël CowardProof by David Auburn

2005The Voice of the Turtle by John Van DrutenGodspell by Stephen Schwartz and John-Michael TebelakDial M for Murder by Frederick KnottPicasso at the Lapin Agile by Steve Martin

2006Wait Until Dark by Frederick KnottBlack Comedy by Peter ShafferLittle Shop of Horrors by Alan Menken and Howard AshmanBetrayal by Harold Pinter

2007Bell, Book and Candle by John Van DrutenBiloxi Blues by Neil Simon10 Little Indians by Agatha Christie'Art' by Yasmina Reza

2008Arcadia by Tom StoppardBus Stop by William IngeAn Inspector Calls by J. B. PriestleyBlithe Spirit by Noël Coward

2009Urinetown by Mark Hollmann and Greg KotisThe Glass Menagerie by Tennessee WilliamsNo Time for Comedy by S. N. BehrmanThe Underpants adapted by Steve Martin from Die Hose by Carl Sternheim

2010The Heidi Chronicles by Wendy WassersteinThe Turn of the Screw by Henry James, adapted by Jeffrey HatcherMisalliance by George Bernard ShawFifth of July by Lanford Wilson

2011Into the Woods by Stephen Sondheim and James LapineBarefoot in the Park by Neil SimonBeyond Therapy by Christopher DurangA Doll's House by Henrik Ibsen

2012A Little Night Music by Hugh Wheeler, music and lyrics by Stephen SondheimGaslight by Patrick HamiltonBoeing-Boeing by Marc CamolettiThe American Plan by Richard Greenberg

2013She Loves Me by Joe Masteroff, lyrics by Sheldon Harnick, and music by Jerry Bock.Crimes of the Heart by Beth HenleyThe 39 Steps by Patrick BarlowTime Stands Still by Donald Margulies

Princeton Summer Theater took a hiatus during the 2014 summer in order to make renovations to the theater.

2015Metamorphoses by Mary ZimmermanPygmalion by George Bernard ShawThe Real Inspector Hound by Tom Stoppard, paired with "The Actor's Nightmare" by Christopher DurangEurydice by Sarah Ruhl

2016Assassins by John Weidman, music and lyrics by Stephen SondheimGod of Carnage by Yasmina Reza, translated by Christopher HamptonRosencrantz and Guildenstern Are Dead by Tom StoppardFool for Love by Sam Shepard

2017Pippin by Roger O. Hirson, music and lyrics by Stephen Schwartz 
The Crucible by Arthur Miller
Spider's Web by Agatha Christie
Appropriate by Branden Jacobs-Jenkins

2018Tick, Tick... Boom! by Jonathan Larson Uncommon Women and Others by Wendy WassersteinThe Children's Hour by Lillian HellmanThe Baltimore Waltz by Paula Vogel

2019Falsettos music and lyrics by William Finn and book by James Lapine Deathtrap (play) by Ira LevinA Midsummer Night's Dream by William ShakespeareTopdog/Underdog by Suzan-Lori Parks

2020
Due to the pandemic of covid-19, the original season was unable to proceed as planned. Instead, the PST board curated a series of virtual events, including a virtual production of the show Night Vision by Dominique Morisseau and directed by Chamari White-Mink. The season also included a virtual production of a new children's play, A Curious Tea Party'' by Annika Bennett.

Princeton Summer Theater took a hiatus in 2021 due to the covid-19 pandemic.
2022
The Great Gatsby by F. Scott Fitzgerald, adapted by Simon Levy 
The Fox on the Fairway by Ken Ludwig 
Detroit '67 by Dominique Morisseau

Company name timeline

References

 https://web.archive.org/web/20070624000047/http://diglib.princeton.edu/ead/eadGetDoc.xq?id=%2Fead%2Fmudd%2Funivarchives%2FAC022.EAD.xml

External links
 Princeton Summer Theater

Sources
 http://princeton.patch.com/listings/princeton-summer-theater.
 Princeton Summer Theater Records, 1968-2008: Finding Aid

Theatre companies in New Jersey
Princeton University